Joan Dunn may refer to:

Joan Hunter Dunn (1915–2008), muse of Sir John Betjeman
Joan Stafford-King-Harman (1918–2018), MI6 operative, known as Lady Dunn during her second marriage

See also
John Dunn (disambiguation)